Eric Samuel Parker (born April 14, 1979) is a former American football wide receiver in the National Football League. He was signed by the Houston Texans as an undrafted free agent in 2002. He played college football at Tennessee.

Parker spent the first six seasons of his career with the San Diego Chargers.

Early years
Parker attended Joliet West High School in Joliet, Illinois.

College career
Parker attended the University of Tennessee after graduating from Joliet West.

Professional career

Houston Texans
Coming out of college, Parker was labeled as injury-prone and thus was passed over in the draft.  He was originally signed by the Houston Texans as an undrafted free agent, but was released by in July.

San Diego Chargers
Shortly after his release from the Texans, Parker was signed by the San Diego Chargers. He spent some time on the practice squad and eventually made the active roster in late 2002.

Parker had a productive campaign in 2003 before a shoulder injury cut his season short. His best season was in 2005 when he caught 57 passes for 725 yards. During the 2006 offseason, the Chargers signed Parker to a new five-year deal.

In 2006, Parker and then #1 wide receiver Keenan McCardell both ended the season with zero touchdown catches. Teammates LaDainian Tomlinson, tight end Antonio Gates and wide receiver Vincent Jackson accounted for the majority of the Chargers' scores.

Parker's 2006 season came to a disappointing end in the Divisional Round of the playoffs. In a game the Chargers lost to the New England Patriots by three points, Parker dropped two passes and fumbled a crucial third-quarter punt, which led to three points for the opposing team.

In 2007, Eric Parker injured his toe during training camp. This led to the Chargers putting him on season-ending injured reserve. He was released by the team on July 23, 2008.

In March 2009, Eric Parker joined the coaching staff of the San Diego Chargers as a wide receivers and conditioning assistant.
He also coaches wrestling at Helix Charter High School.

References

1979 births
Living people
Players of American football from Chicago
People from Shorewood, Illinois
American football wide receivers
Tennessee Volunteers football players
San Diego Chargers players